Kızılkaya is a village in the District of Kalecik, Ankara Province, Turkey.

References

Villages in Kalecik District